Anne-Marie Berglund (31 January 1952 – 6 March 2020) was a Swedish poet, novelist, short story writer and pictorial artist. She was born in Espoo and made her literary debut in 1977 with the poetry collection Luftberusningen. Among her later collections was Jag vill stå träd nu from 2000. Among her several literary prizes, she was awarded the Dobloug Prize in 2002.

References

Further reading 
  

1952 births
2020 deaths
People from Espoo
20th-century Swedish novelists
Swedish women poets
Dobloug Prize winners
Swedish women novelists
20th-century Swedish poets
20th-century Swedish women writers
Swedish short story writers